Peter Harzem (January 5, 1930 – May 26, 2008) was a Turkish-American psychologist who specialised in the field of behavior analysis.

Life
Peter Harzem was born in Istanbul, Turkey on January 5, 1930. His parents were Sukru and Saime Harzem. He initially worked as a newspaper reporter.

After the war he moved to London to complete his education. He was awarded a BSc Psychology from the University of London.  He was strongly influenced by Harry Hurwitz who had established an operant laboratory at Birkbeck College.  Harzem conducted a student project in this laboratory.

He then moved to the University College of North Wales which later became Bangor University where he completed his PhD and obtained a faculty position.

He moved to the United States in 1978 where he became Hudson Professor of Psychology at Auburn University, Alabama.

He died on May 26, 2008, and is buried in Auburn.

Work
Harzem established a reputation for his work on behaviour analysis. At Bangor University, he published an influential volume (Harzem & Miles, 1978). He was also concerned with the role of language. In his later years he became interested in what he termed the discrediting of John B. Watson (Harzem, 1993; 2001). Following on from Hurwitz, Harzen had a continuing interest in the nature of science (Harzem, 2007).

Positions
 Associate editor, Journal of the Experimental Analysis of Behavior.

Publications
 Harzem P. (2007). A brief history of knowledge: Science and non-science in the understanding of human nature. In: Ribes-Inesta E, Burgos J.E, editors. Knowledge, cognition, and behavior: Proceedings of the ninth Biannual Symposium on the Science of Behavior. Guadalajara, Mexico: Universidad de Guadalajara. pp. 11–30.
 Harzen, P.E. (2004). Behaviorism for new psychology: What was wrong with behaviorism and what is wrong with it now. Behavior and Philosophy, 32, 5–12.
 Harzen, P.E. (2001). The Intellectual Dismissal of John B. Watson: Notes on a Dark Cloud in the History of the Psychological Sciences. Behavioral Development Bulletin, 10(1), 15–16.
 Harzem, P. (1993). The discrediting of John Broadus Watson. Mexican Journal of Behavior Analysis, 19, 39–66.
 Zeiler M.D, Harzem P. (Eds.) (1983). Biological factors in learning. New York: Wiley.
 Harzem, P.E. (Ed.)(1981). Predictability, Correlation, and Contiguity New York: Wiley
 Zeiler M.D, Harzem P. (Eds.) (1979). Reinforcement and the organization of behavior. New York: Wiley.
 Harzem, P.E., & Miles, T.R. (1978) Conceptual Issues In Operant Psychology. Chichester: Wiley.

References

1930 births
2008 deaths
People from Istanbul in health professions
Turkish psychologists
Turkish emigrants to the United States
20th-century psychologists
Behaviourist psychologists
Alumni of Bangor University
Auburn University faculty